Žarko Vukčević (born 20 December 1957) is a former Montenegrin football forward who played in Yugoslavia and Turkey.

Career
Born in Herceg Novi, Vukčević moved to Titograd at a young age and started playing football for the youth side of FK Budućnost Titograd. In 1975, he joined the club's senior side and competed in the Yugoslav First League for nine seasons.

He transferred to Zonguldakspor before the 1985–86 season, playing two seasons with the club in the Süper Lig. He returned to Yugoslavia and played one season for OFK Titograd and the following half season with FK Lovćen before retiring.

After his playing career ended, Vukčević became a director of FK Budućnost.

References

External links
 EX YU Fudbalska Statistika po godinama
 

1957 births
Living people
Yugoslav footballers
FK Budućnost Podgorica players
OFK Titograd players
Zonguldakspor footballers
Süper Lig players
Expatriate footballers in Turkey
Association football forwards